"Looking for Love" is the second single from Swedish singer September's album In Orbit.  Released in 2005, it charted in Sweden and Poland, reaching number 17 and number 4, respectively.

The song was included on September's debut UK album, Cry for You, released in August 2009. It samples the track "Run Back" performed by Carl Douglas and written by Dave Stephenson and Steve Elson.

Formats and track listings
"Looking for Love" EP – released: 5 October 2005 (Sweden, Finland, Norway and Denmark)
"Looking for Love" (Radio Version) (3:23)
"Looking for Love" (Extended) (5:09)
"Looking for Love" (Funky Bomb Remix) (3:46)
"Looking for Love" (Funky Bomb Remix Extended) (5:05)

"Looking for Love" EP – released: 11 May 2007 (Australia, Germany and Switzerland)
"Looking for Love" (Radio Version) (3:25)
"Looking for Love" (Extended Version) (5:11)
"Looking for Love" (Michi Lange Remix) (7:37)
"Looking for Love" (Punkstar Remix) (5:55)
"Looking for Love" (Funky Bomb Remix Extended) (5:06)

Charts

References

2005 singles
2005 songs
Petra Marklund songs
Songs written by Jonas von der Burg
Songs written by Anoo Bhagavan
Songs written by Niklas von der Burg
Disco songs
House music songs